Taylor Mill is a home rule-class city in Kenton County, Kentucky, in the United States. The population was 6,604 at the 2010 census, down from 6,913 at the 2000 census. It is the hometown of country music singer Carly Pearce.

History
The city was named for a local mill operated during the early 19th century by James Taylor Jr., the founder of Newport. In 1810 Taylor purchased the land from Jacob Fowler, and the road from what is now Covington to the mill was named Taylor's Mill Road. Others then moved onto the land, felling trees for lumber and clearing land for farming, which began the settling of the city of Taylor Mill.

In 1959 Taylor Mill annexed the former city of Sunny Acres, because its name confused newcomers who associated it with the fictional setting of an episode ("Shady Deal at Sunny Acres") from the popular TV series Maverick. In 1972 the voters of Taylor Mill and Winston Park voted to merge the two cities.

Geography
Taylor Mill is located in northeastern Kenton County at  (39.013062, -84.494192). It is bordered to the north, west, and south by the city of Covington and to the southeast by Fairview and Ryland Heights. An eastern strip of the city runs along the west side of the Licking River, which forms the border of Kenton County. Across the river in Campbell County are the cities of Wilder and Cold Spring.

Interstate 275, the beltway around Cincinnati, passes through the northern part of Taylor Mill, with access from Exit 79 (Kentucky Route 16). KY 16 leads north  to downtown Covington and southwest  to Walton.

Demographics
In 2010 there were 6,604 people and 2,759 housing units in the city, of which 134 were unoccupied.

As of the census of 2000, there were 6,913 people, 2,552 households, and 1,942 families residing in the city. The racial makeup of the city was 97.95% White, 0.42% African American, 0.17% Native American, 0.65% Asian, 0.03% Pacific Islander, 0.14% from other races, and 0.64% from two or more races. Hispanic or Latino of any race were 0.78% of the population.

There were 2,552 households, out of which 37.4% had children under the age of 18 living with them, 62.9% were married couples living together, 9.6% had a female householder with no husband present, and 23.9% were non-families. 19.0% of all households were made up of individuals, and 6.9% had someone living alone who was 65 years of age or older. The average household size was 2.71 and the average family size was 3.13.

In the city, the population was spread out, with 26.4% under the age of 18, 9.3% from 18 to 24, 32.3% from 25 to 44, 21.6% from 45 to 64, and 10.4% who were 65 years of age or older. The median age was 36 years. For every 100 females, there were 96.0 males. For every 100 females age 18 and over, there were 93.6 males.

The median income for a household in the city was $54,069, and the median income for a family was $60,000. Males had a median income of $41,430 versus $29,423 for females. The per capita income for the city was $22,906. About 3.1% of families and 4.8% of the population were below the poverty line, including 5.6% of those under age 18 and 5.7% of those age 65 or over.

Business district
The city has established a business district at the junction of I-275 and Taylor Mill Road. This area is termed The Districts of Taylor Mill and contains four development areas. According to the city's website, “The Districts will transform Taylor Mill with high-quality developments  businesses and shops, alongside a synergistic mix of commercial and office buildings, creating a community for everyone to experience and enjoy.

Schools
Taylor Mill Elementary is named after the city and is the school most kids in Taylor Mill attend, although it is technically located in Covington, Kentucky. It enrolls approximately 620 students from preschool to 5th grade.

Woodland Middle School

Scott High School

https://en.wikipedia.org/wiki/Scott_High_School_(Kentucky)

St. Anthony School
https://www.saintanthonytaylormill.org/school

References

External links
 Official website

Cities in Kenton County, Kentucky
Cities in Kentucky
Populated places established in 1956